Schmiedeberg may refer to:

Bad Schmiedeberg, a town in Saxony-Anhalt, Germany
Schmiedeberg, Saxony, a municipality in Saxony, Germany
Schmiedeberg im Riesengebirge, the German name of Kowary, Poland
The German name of Kovářská, Czech Republic

People with the surname
Oswald Schmiedeberg (1838–1921), German pharmacologist

German-language surnames